The Wawushan Dam is a concrete-face rock-fill dam on the Zhougonghe River in Hongya County, Sichuan Province, China. The primary purpose of the dam is hydroelectric power generation and it supports a 260 MW power station. Construction began on 28 February 2003 and on 10 April 2007, the dam began to impound its reservoir. On 8 January 2008, the first generator was operational and the second 4 February 2008.

See also

List of dams and reservoirs in China
List of major power stations in Guizhou

References

Dams in China
Hydroelectric power stations in Sichuan
Concrete-face rock-fill dams
Dams completed in 2007